The Chinese Ambassador to Montenegro is the official representative of the People's Republic of China to Montenegro.

List of representatives

References 

 
Montenegro
China